Pelanserin (TR2515) is an antagonist of the 5-HT2 and α1-adrenergic receptors.

Synthesis

The reaction between isatoic anhydride (1) and 1-(3-Aminopropyl)-4-phenylpiperazine [20529-19-5] (2) with phosgene completed the synthesis of pelanserin (3).

See also
 Ketanserin

References

5-HT2 antagonists
Alpha-1 blockers